Adrian Brooke Makler (March 16, 1951 – August 29, 2010) was an American Olympic foil and 
épée fencer.

Early and personal life
Makler was born in Philadelphia, Pennsylvania, and was Jewish. He was the son of Paul Makler, Sr., and the brother of Paul Makler, Jr., both of whom fenced for the United States at the Olympics.

Fencing career
He competed for Salle Csiszar.

Makler fenced at the University of Pennsylvania (graduating in 1973) for the University of Pennsylvania Quakers, won the NCAA Championship in Foil in 1973, and was a Second Team All American in Foil in 1972 and a First Team All American in Foil in 1973. He was co-captain of the team in 1973, and was All-Ivy League First Team in 1971 and 1972.

He won gold medals for the US in team épée at the 1975 Pan American Games and the 1979 Pan American Games, and a silver medal in team foil at the 1975 Games.

Makler competed in the team foil and individual and team épée events at the 1976 Summer Olympics, at the age of 25.

He was National Amateur Fencers League of America Épée Champion in 1978.

See also
 List of USFA Division I National Champions

References

External links
 

1951 births
2010 deaths
American male foil fencers
American male épée fencers
Olympic fencers of the United States
Fencers at the 1976 Summer Olympics
Fencers from Philadelphia
Pan American Games medalists in fencing
Pan American Games gold medalists for the United States
Jewish male épée fencers
Jewish male foil fencers
Jewish American sportspeople
Fencers at the 1975 Pan American Games
University of Pennsylvania alumni
Penn Quakers fencers
21st-century American Jews
Medalists at the 1975 Pan American Games
Medalists at the 1979 Pan American Games